This is a list of megaprojects within the transport sector. Care should be taken in comparing the cost of projects from different times, even a few years apart due to inflation; comparing nominal costs without taking this into account can be highly misleading. Note that inflation-calculated values are current .

According to the Oxford Handbook of Megaproject Management in 2017, "Megaprojects are large-scale, complex ventures that typically cost $1 billion or more, take many years to develop and build, involve multiple public and private stakeholders, are transformational, and impact millions of people".

Completed projects

Partially completed and open

Under construction

Proposed

Airport projects

Notes

References

Megaprojects

Infrastructure-related lists
Megaprojects
Lists of most expensive things